The Green Line or Line 2 is one of the two lines of Chennai Metro, Phase 1 Project. Out of the 17 stations, 9 stations are  underground and 8 are elevated.

Map

Stations

Green Line
The line connects the central, the western and the southern ends of the city. The stations include :

Inter-Corridor Line

See also

 Chennai
 Blue Line
 Chennai Metro
 List of Chennai metro stations
 Chennai Monorail
 Chennai Mass Rapid Transit System
 Chennai Suburban Railway
 Transport in Chennai
 List of rapid transit systems in India
 List of metro systems

References

External links

 

Chennai Metro lines
Railway lines opened in 2015
2015 establishments in Tamil Nadu